Ronald Koeman (born 23 May 1995), commonly known as Ronald Koeman jr., is a Dutch professional footballer who plays as a goalkeeper for Eerste Divisie club Telstar.

Career
Koeman came through the youth system at Almere City but never made an appearance for the first team. In 2015, he moved to FC Oss to increase his chances at first team playing time. He made his debut on 29 April 2016 in an Eerste Divisie game against FC Volendam as a substitute, coming on in the 83rd minute for Xavier Mous in a 2–1 home defeat.

On 25 June 2021, it was announced that Koeman had signed with Telstar.

Personal life
He is the son of former Netherlands international footballer, and former Barcelona manager Ronald Koeman, the nephew of former Dutch international football player Erwin Koeman, and the grandson of former Dutch international Martin Koeman.

Career statistics

Notes

References

External links
 

1995 births
Living people
Dutch footballers
Almere City FC players
TOP Oss players
SC Telstar players
Eerste Divisie players
Footballers from Barcelona
Association football goalkeepers
Koeman family